Lord Mouse and the Kalypso Katz were a calypso band based in Berlin.  Starting as an active band in 2008, their music was produced independently, with help from Cannery Row Records of Berlin, Jump Up! records of Chicago, and Zamzama Productions of Paris. The second album, "Go Calypsonian" was released by the Piranha Musik label in Berlin.

Biography
Lord Mouse and the Kalypso Katz was a Calypso band in the city of Berlin, and one of the few on the continent of Europe. It was formed to bring public awareness of the style to countries across Europe, but later gained a healthy following in Russia and Japan, as well.
The musical style, originally from the island of Trinidad, began in earnest in the mid- 1920s, when it was first recorded, and grew in popularity in the United States in the 1950s through the work of Harry Belafonte. Since then, the genre has been all but forgotten in Europe. From the inception of the band the genre has become slowly recognized as a legitimate and dance-worthy musical form within the continent, spreading from Berlin outwards.
Although the band was based in Berlin, the members came from all over the world, including the U.S., Russia, England, Australia, Brazil, Poland, France, Italy, Finland, and of course, Germany.
The band stayed within the classic sound of the 1920s and 1930s as possible, while still utilizing modern recording techniques. While much of its work is original, there are also covers, used as a reference point, by such calypso heavyweights as Roaring Lion, Young Tiger, Caresser and Lord Invader.

With support from SOAS Radio London DJ Rita Ray of the band The Darts, as well as articles in France's major publication Libération, United States' N.P.R. Italian music critic Paolo Ferrari of Rumore, the BBC, major Berlin news outlets, etc. the band was able to forge a successful relationship with both the industry people and a wider audience.  Since then, Lord Mouse and the Kalypso Katz have shared stages with performers including Joe Cocker, Bjork, Iggy Pop,  Joan Baez, Patti Smith, Robert Plant, Ben Harper, Youssou N'Dour, Véronique Sanson, Herbie Hancock & Chick Corea and Rene LaCaille.

In 2013 their 2nd studio album Go Calypsonian was produced by Colin Bass of 3 Mustaphas 3 and  Camel and reached #6 on the European World Music charts for July–August, floating on the top ten throughout the summer.

In January 2015 Lord Mouse (Keeley Brineman), band leader General Confusion (Boris Kontorowski), and Piranha Music, with support from Erica Smith and COSCAP invited many Soca stars from Barbados and St. Lucia for a cultural exchange in Berlin.
Included were Red Plastic Bag, Charles D. Lewis, Wayne "Poonka" Willock, Anderson "Blood" Armstrong, Lennon "Blaze" Prospere and Nicholas Brancker. It was viewed by critics and fans as a general success, with hopes of creating a deeper tie between the West Indies and Europe. 
The above mentioned stars returned again in the summer of 2016 to team up with The Kalypso Katz with even better reception, paving the way for stronger cultural ties between the West Indies and Europe.

Since then, their Christmas single "Calypso Christmas (Christmas in Trinidad)" has been released on CD and LP in Japan on a compilation of holiday songs. They have also starred in many TV programmes in Germany, including the children's TV show Loewen Zahn.

Discography
Self Titled (2009)
Cannery Row records
Track Listing
  Rat Race Calypso
 Wash Your Hands
 Chicken Calypso
Jack's Broth
In the Jungle
 Calypso Be
 Don't Blame it on Elvis
 Fe Da Re
 Don't Judge me
 Kalypso Katz Calypso
 Boko's Mambo Calypso
- Also available on 10" vinyl records from Jump Up! Records
[10" JUR] (2010)Jump Up!

Go Calypsonian
(2013) Piranha records
Track Listing
Monkey Bop	
Edward The VIII	
Chunga Changa	
White Boy Calypso	
Barefooted Lover	
Limbo Song	
Goombay Drum	
Calypso Hipshake	
Snake Charmer	
Sombrero	
Pussycat	
Dream Of A Jungle Cat

See also
Mighty Sparrow
Roaring Lion
Lord Kitchener
Lord Invader
Attila the Hun

References
 Zamzama Productions
 NPR Berlin
 Storyamp
 Beats International
 Liberation Magazine
 The Barbados Advocate
 St. Lucia Star

External links
 Official website
 FB official page
 Zamzama productions
 Piranha Musik

German musical groups
Musical groups from Berlin
Mento
Calypsonians